XLP may refer to:

 Extreme-low power, a class of sub-ultra-low power (ULP) electronics at the very forefront of current technology since ca. 2015
 X-linked lymphoproliferative disease, a disease in hematology

See also 
 Zero-power device, (typically battery-less) ULP/XLP devices powered through energy harvesting